Víctor Boulanger (born 15 July 1940) is a Peruvian footballer. He competed in the men's tournament at the 1960 Summer Olympics.

References

External links
 
 

1940 births
Living people
Peruvian footballers
Peru international footballers
Olympic footballers of Peru
Footballers at the 1960 Summer Olympics
People from Talara
Association football defenders
Atlético Torino footballers